

LG Mobile phones abbreviations
B stand for Broadcast Models T-DMB/S-DMB/DVB-H/DVB-T/ISDB-T/MediaFLO
C stand for US GSM/3G
F stand for Fashion
G stand for GSM
K stand for Europe GSM/3G
M stand for Latin America
R stand for India
S stand for Korean Internal Market CDMA / Smartphone
T stand for Canada & Australia
U stand for UMTS/WCDMA/3G
V stand for Verizon CDMA

Canadian market models

TE series
 LG TE365 (Neon)

TU series
 LG TU330 (Globus)
 LG TU500
 LG TU515
 LG TU750 (Secret)
 LG TU915 (Vu)

US market models
LG 4NE1

US Cellular CDMA models
LG Genesis (US760)

CB series
 LG CB630

CE series
 LG CE100
 LG CE110

CF series
LG CF360

CG series
LG CG225
LG CG300
LG CG325

CU series
LG CU400
LG CU405
LG CU500
LG CU500v
LG CU515
LG CU575 (Trax)
LG CU720 (Shine)
LG CU915/CU920 (Vu)

LG series
LG LG500G (product page) TracFone
LG LG501C TracFone.
LG LG840G TracFone.

LX series
LG LX140
LG LX5550 no camera
LG LX5350

Optimus series
LG LS670 Optimus S
LG MS690 Optimus M
LG P509 Optimus T
LG US670 Optimus U
LG VM670 Optimus V
LG VS660 Vortex

Verizon CDMA models

VS series
LG VS660 (Vortex)
LG VS700 (Enlighten)
LG VS740 (Ally)
LG VS880 (LG G Vista™)
LG VS920 (Spectrum)
LG VS930 (Spectrum 2)

VX series

LG VX10
LG VX1000 (Migo)
LG VX2000
LG VX3100
LG VX3200
LG VX3300
LG VX3400
LG VX4400
LG VX4500
LG VX4650
LG VX5200
LG VX5300
LG VX5400
LG VX5500
LG VX5600 (Accolade)
LG VX6000
LG VX6100
LG VX7000
LG VX8000 (2004)
LG VX8100
LG VX8300
LG VX8350
LG VX8360
LG VX8500 (Chocolate)
LG VX8550 (Chocolate)
LG VX8560 (Chocolate)
LG VX8575 (Chocolate Touch)
LG VX8600
LG VX8700
LG VX8800 (Venus)
LG VX9100 (enV2)
LG VX9200 (enV3)
LG VX9400
LG VX9600 (Versa)
LG VX9700 (Dare)
LG VX9800 (The V)
LG VX9900 (enV)
LG VX10000 (Voyager)
LG VX11000 (enV Touch)

European market models

Optimus G series

 LG Optimus G
 LG Optimus G Pro
 LG G2
 LG G3
 LG G4
 LG G5
 LG G6
 LG G7
 LG G8
 LG G3 Stylus
 LG G4 Stylus
 LG G Flex
 LG G Flex 2
 LG G Pad 8.3
 LG G Pro 2
 LG L22 (G2 Japan)

GC series
LG GC900 (Viewty Smart)

GD series
LG GD230
LG GD510 (LG Pop)

GS series
LG GS290 (Cookie Fresh)
LG GS500v (Cookie Plus)
LG GS155a
LG GS108

GT series
LG GT540 Optimus

GW series
 LG GW525 cookie
 LG GW620 Eve
 LG GW820 eXpo

GX series
LG GX200
LG GX300
LG GX500

KC series
LG KC910 Renoir
LG KC550

KE series
LG KE500
LG KE850 (Prada)
LG KE970 (Shine)

KF series
LG KF245
LG KF300
LG KF310
LG KF311
LG KF390
LG KF510
LG KF600
LG KF700
LG KF750 (Secret)
LG KF900 (Prada II)

KG series
LG KG288 with am/fm radio
LG KG300 Perfect Multimedia
LG KG600 (Same as KF600)
LG KG800 chocolate

KM series
LG KM380
LG KM570 Cookie Gig
LG KM900 Arena

KP series
LG KP100
LG KP105
LG KP110
LG KP215
LG KP220
LG KP230
LG KP320
LG KP330
LG Cookie (KP500)
LG KP199

KS series
LG KS20 tv.out phone
LG KS360
LG KS500
LG KS365

KU series
LG KU830
LG KU970 (Shine 3G)
LG KU990R

Latin American market models

ME series
LG ME600

MG series
LG MG320 (Aegis)
LG MG810 (Black Zafiro)

PM series
LG PM225
LG PM325

Early 3G UMTS models

U series
LG K8000 (aka G8000)
LG U8110
LG U8120
LG U8138
LG U8180
LG U8210
LG U8260
LG U8330
LG U8360
LG U8380
LG U8500
LG U300
LG U400
LG U830 (Chocolate 3G Folder)
LG U900 - the World's First DVB-H Phone
LG U960
LG U990

Optimus series

Optimus GT540
Optimus 3D P920
Optimus 3D Max P720
Optimus 2X SU660
Optimus 7 E900
LS670 Optimus S
MS690 Optimus M
Optimus One P500
Optimus Net P690 (also called Optimus Spirit P690)
Optimus Me P350
Optimus Black P970
Optimus Chic E720
Optimus Sol E730
Optimus 2X P990
Optimus 4X HD P880
P509 Optimus T
US670 Optimus U
VM670 Optimus V
VS660 Vortex
Optimus L3 E400
Optimus L3 II E430
Optimus L4 II E440
LG Optimus L5 E610
LG Optimus L7 P700
LG Optimus L9 P760

LG Android series
 Model L56.0

Other series

New Cell Phones ► Smartphone

V & Q Series 
 LG Velvet
 LG V60 ThinQ
 LG V50 ThinQ
 LG V40 ThinQ
 LG V35 ThinQ
 LG V30
 LG V20
 LG V10
 LG Q9
 LG Q8
 LG Q7
 LG Q6

G Series 
 LG G8 ThinQ
 LG G7 ThinQ
 LG G6
 LG G5
 LG G4
 LG G3
 LG G2
 LG Optimus G

Models that end with GO
LG A100GO
LG A133GO
LG A140GO
LG A170GO
LG A225GO
LG AX145GO
LG AX155GO
LG AX260GO
LG AX265GO
LG AX275GO
LG AX310GO
LG B2050GO
LG B2100GO
LG BL20GO
LG C1100GO
LG C2200GO
LG C3300GO
LG C3310GO
LG C3320GO
LG C300GO
LG CF360GO
LG CF360GO1

A series
LG A7110
LG A7150
LG A100
LG A100A
LG A100GO
LG A108
LG A110
LG A120
LG A130
LG A133
LG A133CH
LG A133GO
LG A133R
LG A140
LG A140GO
LG A155
LG A160
LG A165
LG A170
LG A170GO
LG A175
LG A175A
LG A175B
LG A180
LG A180A
LG A180B
LG A190
LG A190B
LG A200
LG A210A
LG A210AN
LG A210B
LG A225
LG A225GO
LG A230
LG A235
LG A250
LG A255
LG A258
LG A260
LG A270
LG A270E
LG A271
LG A275
LG A290
LG A310
LG A310F
LG A340
LG A341
LG A350
LG A353
LG A395
LG A447

AD series
LG AD2535
LG AD2635
LG AD3335
LG AD5235
LG AD5435
LG AD600
LG AD6335

AX series
LG AX140
LG AX145
LG AX145GO
LG AX155
LG AX155GO
LG AX245
LG AX260
LG AX260GO
LG AX265
LG AX265GO
LG AX275GO
LG AX275SV
LG AX300
LG AX310
LG AX3100
LG AX310GO
LG AX3200
LG AX355
LG AX380
LG AX390
LG AX4270
LG AX4750
LG AX490
LG AX500
LG AX5000
LG AX5450
LG AX5550
LG AX565
LG AX585
LG AX8100
LG AX830
LG AX8370
LG AX840A
LG AX8575
LG AX8600

B series
LG B1100
LG B1200
LG B1300
LG B2000
LG B2050
LG B2050GO
LG B2060
LG B2070
LG B2100
LG B2100GO
LG B2150
LG B2250

BD series
LG BD2030
LG BD2233
LG BD4000
LG BD5130
LG BD6070

BL series
LG BL20
LG BL20cf
LG BL20E
LG BL20GO
LG BL20T
LG BL20v
LG BL40
LG BL40e
LG BL40f
LG BL40g
LG BL42k

BP series
LG BP3200
LG BP4270
LG BP5000
LG BP5550
LG BP6100

BX series
LG BX4170
LG BX5450
LG BX6170
LG BX7000

C series
LG C1100
LG C1100GO
LG C1150
LG C1200
LG C1300
LG C1300i
LG C1400
LG C1500
LG C2000
LG C2100
LG C2200
LG C2200GO
LG C3100
LG C3300
LG C3300GO
LG C3310
LG C3310GO
LG C3320
LG C3320GO
LG C3380
LG C3400
LG C3600
LG C100
LG C105
LG C193
LG C195
LG C195N
LG C199
LG C205
LG C258
LG C260
LG C270
LG C280
LG C290
LG C300
LG C300GO
LG C305
LG C305N
LG C310
LG C320
LG C320I
LG C330
LG C330I
LG C333
LG C360
LG C365
LG C370
LG C375
LG C395
LG C397
LG C399
LG C440
LG C550
LG C555
LG C570F
LG C570G
LG C600
LG C610
LG C620
LG C630
LG C636
LG C650
LG C660
LG C660H
LG C660R
LG C670
LG C676
LG C680
LG C686
LG C710H
LG C729DW
LG C800DG
LG C800G
LG C810
LG C820
LG C900
LG C900B
LG C900K
LG C910
LG C930
LG C950
LG C960

CB series
LG CB630

CD series
LG CD02
LG CD3000
LG CD3600
LG CD6100

CE series
LG CE110
LG CE500
LG CE0168

CF series
LG CF360
LG CF360GO
LG CF360GO1
LG CF750

CG series
LG CG180
LG CG225
LG CG300

CM series
LG CM101

CP series
LG CP150

CT series
LG CT100
LG CT810
LG CT815

CU series
LG CU320
LG CU400
LG CU405
LG CU500
LG CU500V
LG CU500v
LG CU515
LG CU515R
LG CU575
LG CU6060
LG CU6160
LG CU6260
LG CU6360
LG CU6760
LG CU720
LG CU8080
LG CU8180
LG CU8188
LG CU8280
LG CU8380
LG CU915
LG CU920

CX series
LG CX1000
LG CX10000B
LG CX10000BW
LG CX10000T
LG CX125
LG CX150
LG CX150B
LG CX150V
LG CX160P
LG CX160V
LG CX200
LG CX210
LG CX230S
LG CX230V
LG CX231
LG CX231P
LG CX245
LG CX260
LG CX260B
LG CX260P
LG CX260S
LG CX260V
LG CX265
LG CX265B
LG CX265P
LG CX265S
LG CX265T
LG CX265V
LG CX265X
LG CX280
LG CX280B
LG CX285
LG CX3200
LG CX325
LG CX325B
LG CX3300
LG CX3300B
LG CX3300V
LG CX380
LG CX385
LG CX385B
LG CX400K
LG CX4600
LG CX4750
LG CX490
LG CX500K
LG CX535
LG CX5400
LG CX5400B
LG CX5400S
LG CX5450
LG CX550
LG CX5500
LG CX5500X
LG CX550B
LG CX5550
LG CX570
LG CX570V
LG CX600
LG CX600B
LG CX600K
LG CX6070
LG CX6100
LG CX6200
LG CX6200B
LG CX670
LG CX700
LG CX700B
LG CX700K
LG CX700V
LG CX7100
LG CX7100X
LG CX800
LG CX800B
LG CX8100
LG CX830
LG CX830B
LG CX8500
LG CX8550
LG CX8560
LG CX8600
LG CX8700B
LG CX8700BW
LG CX8700T
LG CX8700X
LG CX8800
LG CX9100
LG CX9100X
LG CX9200
LG CX9600
LG CX9700

D series
LG D280N 
LG D290N 
LG D295 (Dual Sim)

F series

LG F1200
LG F2100
LG F2200
LG F2250
LG F2300
LG F2400
LG F3000
LG F7200
LG F7250
LG F9100
LG F9200
LG F400L

G series
LG G1100
LG G1500
LG G1610
LG G1700
LG G1800
LG G3000
LG G3100
LG G4011
LG G4015
LG G4020
LG G4050
LG G5220C
LG G5300
LG G5300I
LG G5310
LG G5400
LG G5450
LG G5500
LG G5600
LG G6070
LG G7000
LG G7020
LG G7030
LG G7050
LG G7070
LG G7100
LG G7120
LG G7200
LG G8000
LG G210
LG G510
LG G510W
LG G650
LG G912

GB series
LG GB102
LG GB106
LG GB108
LG GB109
LG GB110
LG GB115
LG GB125
LG GB130
LG GB170
LG GB190
LG GB210
LG GB220
LG GB230
LG GB250
LG GB270
LG GB280

LU series
LG LU1600
LG LU2300
LG LU3000
LG LU3100
LG LU3700
LG LU4400
LG LU4500
LG LU6300
LG LU640
LG LU9000
LG LU9100
LG LU930
LG LU9400
LG LU9400W
LG LU6200

M series
LG M4300
LG M4330
LG M4410
LG M6100
LG MG110
LG MG150
LG MG155c
LG MG160
LG MG165
LG MX7000

P series
LG P350
LG P500
LG P500H
LG P503
LG P506
LG P880
LG P970
LG P999
LG P7200

S series
LG S5300

SU Series
LG SU370
LG SU620

T series
LG T310 Cookie/Wink Style
LG T320 Cookie 3G
LG T370 Cookie Smart
LG T375 Cookie Smart
LG T385 "New Cookie"
LG T580

V series
LG V905R
LG V900
LG V960
LG VS990

W Series

LG W41
LG W41+
LG W41 Pro
LG W31
LG W31+
LG W11

X series 

 LG X Venture
 LG X Charge
 LG X Power
 LG X Style
 LG X Cam
 LG X Screen
 LG X Mach

LG Stylo Series 

 LG Stylo 4
 LG Stylo 5
 LG Stylo 6
 LG G Stylo

See also
LG Cyon
GU230
LG Xenon

References

External links
LG Mobile US home website

LG mobile phones